Busonga is a settlement in Kenya's Nyanza Province. It is also most widely used and recognized as 'Usonga'. The 'Busonga' pronunciation is widely used in Luhya land while describing the Usonga area (Siaya county). The people of Usonga are called 'Jo usonga: Usonga have many villages, including Sidundo, Mahero, Uhembo, Mahur, Nyangera, Nyadorera, Sega, Mdawo, Udamayi, Ulupi, Mlambo, Uwasi, Bukhabo, Ndagaywa, and Abu.

References 

Populated places in Nyanza Province